Nearly A Happy Ending is a television play written by Victoria Wood, which ITV broadcast on 1 June 1980.

It is a sequel to Wood's earlier play Talent, with the same lead characters: Julie (played by Julie Walters) and Maureen (played by Wood); although some minor plot points from Talent are either ignored or contradicted in this play.

According to the BFI's Screenonline website, the plot concerns "Maureen's ill-fated attempts to lose her virginity at a dismal salesmen's party in a Manchester hotel".

Cast

References

External links

1980 television plays
Films about virginity
Plays by Victoria Wood